The 2022 Canoe Sprint European Championships (32nd) was held from 18 to 21 August 2022 in Munich, Germany. Event was part of 2022 European Championships multi event.

Medal table

Medallists

Men

Women

Paracanoe

Medal events
 Non-Paralympic classes

Participating countries

Notes

References

External links
Official website
Results book

Canoe Sprint European Championships
European Championships
Canoe Sprint European Championships
Sport in Munich
Canoeing in Germany
2022 European Championships
Canoe Sprint